Bojan Đerić (born 2 February 1982) is a Serbian professional basketball coach who is an assistant coach for Crvena zvezda U19.

Coaching career 
In 2006, Đerić stated his coaching career in youth system of FMP Železnik. He won two Euroleague Next Generation Tournaments with their under-18 team. In 2011, Đerić became a high school coach for the First Sports Basketball High School – College Belgrade.

With the Crvena zvezda U19 team, Đerić lost two finals of the Junior ABA League, in 2018 and 2019. In the 2019 Final, his team had a 73–63 loss to Cibona U19.

On 13 December 2020, FMP hired Đerić as their interim head coach. In his official head coaching debut in the ABA on 15 December, Đerić led FMP to a 99–89 overtime loss to Zadar. He finished his stint as the interim head coach with a 3–5 record on 13 February 2021, becoming an assistant coach to new FMP head coach Vanja Guša. On 17 August 2022, Crvena zvezda hired Đerić as their new assistant coach for the under-19 team.

References

External links
 Đerić ABA League Profile
 Bojan Djeric at eurobasket.com

1982 births
Living people
KK Crvena zvezda youth coaches
KK FMP coaches
Sportspeople from Belgrade
Serbian men's basketball coaches
University of Belgrade Faculty of Sport and Physical Education alumni